Salvia splendens, the scarlet sage, is a tender herbaceous perennial plant native to Brazil, growing at  elevation where it is warm year-round and with high humidity. Smaller cultivars are very popular as bedding plants, seen in shopping malls and public gardens all over the world.

Taxonomy
Salvia splendens was first described and named in 1822. At that time it was given the common name "Lee's scarlet sage". Before the plant was selected to become dwarf in size, an early Dutch selection named 'Van Houttei' was chosen and is still popular in the horticulture trade.

Description
Its leaves are in even, elliptical arrangements, 7 × 5 cm, with dentate margin and they have long petioles. It may branched, where its upper branches are finely hairy and in the lower parts though hairless. Flowers in erect spikes that sprout from the centre of the plant in groups of 2 to 6 together in each leaf node; scarlet, tubular or bell-shaped, 35 mm long, with two lobes towards the apex; the upper lobe is 13 mm long. It flowers a good part of summer and autumn.

Cultivation 
It is widely grown as an ornamental plant, with a large number of cultivars selected by different colours from white to dark purple. It is a subtropical species that does not survive freezing temperatures, but can grow in cold climates as an annual plant. The most common selections are the dwarf sizes that go by names such as 'Sizzler' and 'Salsa', and planted en masse in gardens and malls. 'Van Houttei' reaches  in height. The various types typically have red flowers.

Cultivars
Named cultivars include: 
S. splendens 'Alba', with white flowers
'Atropurpurea', with dark violet to purple flowers
'Atrosanguinea', flowers dark red 
'Bicolor', flowers white and red 
'Bruantii', small, with red flowers 
'Compacta', small, flowers in dense racemes, white or red
'Grandiflora', large, with large red flowers 
'Issanchon', small, with white flowers striped pink to red 
'Nana', an early-flowering cultivar, with red blossoms
'Scarlet Pygmy', a very dwarf, early flowering seed race with intense scarlet blossoms 
'Semperflorens', continuous flowering 
'Souchetii', small, with white or red flowers 
'St. John's Fire', dwarf plants with dense, abundant, scarlet, early-flowering, long-lasting blossoms
'Violacea', flowers dark violet to purple.

The cultivars 'Vanguard' and 'Van-Houttei' have gained the  Royal Horticultural Society's Award of Garden Merit.

References

External links
 UC Berkeley: Observations on Salvia splendens
Interview with Daniel Siebert on S. splendens and S. divinorum

splendens
Flora of Brazil
Medicinal plants
Plants used in traditional Chinese medicine
Garden plants of South America